Guenter Seidel (born 23 September 1960) is an American equestrian. He was born in Bavaria, Germany, but represents the United States after moving to the country in 1985.  He won a bronze medal in team dressage at the 1996 Summer Olympics in Atlanta, together with Robert Dover, Michelle Gibson and Steffen Peters. He also won bronze medals in team dressage at the 2000 Summer Olympics in Sydney, and at the 2004 Summer Olympics in Athens. He is openly gay.

Notable Horses 

 Graf George – 1982 Gray Gelding
 1996 Atlanta Olympics – Team Bronze Medal, Individual Eighth Place
 1997 FEI World Cup Final – Eighth Place
 1998 World Equestrian Games – Team Fourth Place, Individual Eighth Place
 Foltaire – 1987 Bay Dutch Warmblood Gelding (Voltaire x Afrikaner)
 2000 Sydney Olympics – Team Bronze Medal
 Nikolas 7 – 1989 Bay Westfalen Gelding (Weinberg x Exponent)
 2002 World Equestrian Games – Individual 18th Place
 2003 FEI World Cup Final – Bronze Medal
 2004 FEI World Cup Final – Sixth Place
 Aragon – 1992 Gray Bavarian Gelding (Abydos x Lorenz)
 2004 Athens Olympics – Team Bronze Medal, Individual 14th Place
 2005 FEI World Cup Final – 12th Place
 2006 World Equestrian Games – Team Bronze Medal, Individual 13th Place Grand Prix, Individual 13th Place Freestyle
 Zero Gravity – 2004 Chestnut Dutch Warmblood Gelding (Royal Hit x Contango)
 2016 FEI World Cup Final – 18th Place

References

External links

1960 births
Gay sportsmen
LGBT equestrians
German LGBT sportspeople
American LGBT sportspeople
Living people
Bavarian emigrants to the United States
American male equestrians
American dressage riders
Olympic bronze medalists for the United States in equestrian
Equestrians at the 1996 Summer Olympics
Equestrians at the 2000 Summer Olympics
Equestrians at the 2004 Summer Olympics
People from Oberallgäu
Sportspeople from Swabia (Bavaria)
Medalists at the 2004 Summer Olympics
Medalists at the 2000 Summer Olympics
Medalists at the 1996 Summer Olympics
Equestrians at the 1995 Pan American Games
Pan American Games silver medalists for the United States
Pan American Games medalists in equestrian
Medalists at the 1995 Pan American Games